Adenodolichos paniculatus is a plant in the legume family Fabaceae, native to tropical Africa. The specific epithet means "with panicles", referring to the plant's many-branched inflorescence.

Description

Distribution and habitat
Adenodolichos paniculatus is native to countries of tropical Africa, from Guinea in the west to Sudan in the east and south to the Democratic Republic of the Congo.

References

paniculatus
Flora of West Tropical Africa
Flora of West-Central Tropical Africa
Flora of Chad
Flora of Sudan
Flora of Uganda
Plants described in 1897
Taxa named by John Hutchinson (botanist)